Terence Nance (born February 10, 1982) is an American filmmaker, writer, director, actor and musician from Dallas, Texas. He is best known for his directing debut An Oversimplification of Her Beauty, and as the creator of the avant-garde TV program Random Acts of Flyness, which is produced by his production company MVMT and airs on HBO.

Early life
Nance was born in Dallas, Texas. He earned his MFA  from New York University where he studied visual art.

Career
Nance's 2012 film An Oversimplification of Her Beauty incorporates an earlier short film, animation and an original score. It premiered in the Sundance Film Festival's New Frontier section in 2012 and was also screened as part of the 2012 New Directors/New Films Festival in New York.
Scholar Terri Francis has described it as "...an experimental film...that recreates the unspoken space amid friendship and relationships. Starring Terence Nance himself and the girl with whom he is caught up in this difficult dance, the film shifts between reconstruction and reimagining using both animation and live action."
The film was also featured at a screening as part of the Afrofuturist Film Festival at the New School on 3 May 2015.

In August 2018, Nance's TV series Random Acts of Flyness debuted on HBO. In September 2018, Nance was announced as the director of the sequel to Space Jam, produced by Ryan Coogler. On July 16, 2019, it was announced that Nance left the project because he and "the studio/producers had different takes on the creative vision for Space Jam: A New Legacy", though he retained both screenwriting and executive producing credits.

Nance also composes and performs music under the alias "Terence Etc.", composing some of the music for his Random Acts of Flyness series and releasing his debut EP Things I Never Had in January 2020. His debut full-length album V O R T E X was released on August 19, 2022 under the Brainfeeder label.

Personal life
Nance is in a relationship with Naima Ramos-Chapman. The two met while they interviewed him for Saint Heron, the creative agency owned by Solange Knowles.

Filmography
Film

Short films

Television

Discography

Studio albums
 V O R T E X (2022)

EPs
 Things I Never Had (2020)

Accolades

References

External links
 Official website
 

Living people
African-American artists
American artists
People from Dallas
1982 births
21st-century African-American people
20th-century African-American people